The Assam Police is the law enforcement agency for the state of Assam in India. A regular police force was initiated in Assam by the British after the Treaty of Yandaboo to maintain the law and order. It functions under the Department of Home Affairs, Assam. The headquarters of Assam Police is situated at Ulubari in the state capital Guwahati.

Organizational structure 
Assam Police comes under direct control of Department of Home Affairs, Government of Assam.
The Assam Police is headed by a Director General of Police (DGP). The current DGP of the Assam Police is G.P. Singh, IPS
 Assam police forces are organized into police ranges, headed by an inspector general deputy inspector general, who controls several police districts.
 The police district is the fulcrum of state police activity and each district is headed by a superintendent. In many states a superintendent is assisted by one or more additional superintendents or deputy superintendents. Generally, a police district is same as a revenue district of a state.
 The police district is divided into police sub-divisions under the command of a deputy superintendent of subdivision police officer.
 The police sub-division is made up of one or more police circles, and is under the command of an inspector, often referred to as the circle inspector.
 Under the police circles are the police stations, generally under the control of a sub-inspector.

Assam state police force also maintains its own Reserve Armed police force (special armed police and armed police) which is responsible for emergencies and crowd control issues. They are generally activated only on orders from the rank of DIG and higher-level authorities. The armed constabulary do not usually come into contact with the general public unless they are assigned to VIP duty, counter-insurgency operations, riot control or to maintain law and order during fairs, festivals, athletic events, elections, and natural disasters. They may also be sent to quell outbreaks of student or labour unrest, organised crime, to maintain guard posts and to participate in anti-terrorist operations. Depending on the type of assignment, the Armed Police force may carry lathis or lethal weapons.

Assam Police also have an elite commando group known as the "Black Panthers" equipped with modern weapons and technology for anti-terrorist operations and VVIP protection.

Branches 
With the growth and development of the police administration in the post-colonial era, a number of new branches were established to meet the increasing demands of law and order. Some of these branches are:

 Bureau of Investigation (Economic Offenses)
 Special Branch
 Criminal Investigation Department
 Assam Police Border Organization
 Assam Police Radio Organization
 Assam River Police Organization
 Directorate of Forensic Science. Assam
 Assam Village Defense Organization.
 Fire & Emergency Services, Assam
 State Disaster Response Force, Assam
 Assam Police Highway Patrol Unit, (to be Introduced) 

The Assam Police has grown from strength to strength during the last two decade. In 1980 it had a force of 40,290 and at the end of the 20th century its numerical strength stands at 60,721.

Battalion and Reserved Forces 

Battalion

Assam Police Battalion personnels are engaged in the onerous task of helping the district police in maintaining Law and Order, besides guarding the vital installations round the clock, including Counter Insurgency, Riot control . They are also engaged in other static security duties.

1st APBN Headquartered at Sibsagar.

2nd APBN Headquartered at Makum Tinisukia.

3rd APBN Headquartered at Jorhat.

4th APBN Headquartered at Guwahati.

5th APBN Headquartered at NC Hills.

6th APBN Headquartered at Cachar.

7th APBN Headquartered at Kokrajhar.

8th APBN Headquartered at Abhayapuri.

9th APBN Headquartered at Nagaon.

10th APBN Headquartered at Guwahati.

11th APBN Headquartered at Dergaon.

12th APBN Headquartered at Jamugurihat Sonitpur.

13th APBN Headquartered at North Lakhimpur.

14th APBN Headquartered at Nalbari

IRBN

The raising of CPMF can only meet the regular and increasing demand of the state. It was decided to augment the strengths of the state governments. It is in this context that I.R. Battalions were raised in Assam with the assistance of the central government. The central government however reserves the first right to call on these battalions as and when required for deployment outside the state. The personnel of the battalion are engaged in both operational as well as law and order duties.
15th AP IRBN headquartered at Karimganj
16th AP IRBN headquartered at Morigaon
19th AP IRBN headquartered at Dibrugarh
20th AP IRBN headquartered at Dhubri
21st AP IRBN headquartered at Hailakandi
22nd AP IRBN headquartered at Dhemaji
23rd AP IRBN headquartered at Karbi Anglong
24th AP IRBN headquartered at Baksa

Task Force

APTF Battalion of Assam Police Task Force was raised as a speciality peace keeping force to tackle the instances of communal and group violence.
The personnel of this force were posted in vulnerable areas and minority pockets, so that any sign of communal disharmony could be quickly countered and prevented from flaring up into a major communal violence. This force has functioned effectively as an emergency task force.

1st APTF headquartered at Goalpara

2nd APTF headquartered at Nagaon

3rd APTF headquartered at Darrang

4th APTF headquartered at Barpeta

Commando Battalion 

Black Panthers:- The Black Panther is a specially trained commando Battalion to deal with counter insurgency operations. This Battalion is headquartered at Mandakata of North Guwahati.

Veerangana:- The Veerangana is a specialised women commando battalion to deal with difficult situations specially women security issues. This force is headquartered at Mandakata of North Guwahati.

SPU:- The "Special Protection Unit" is a modern and unique commando force in Assam Police. It basically deals with issues regarding urban policing or VIP security matters.

ONGC Battalion

25th AP (ONGC) IRBN with temporary Headquartered at Sibsagar for the security of ONGC drilling fields, Employees and ONGC related pickets.

Medals and awards 
Officers of Assam Police got many awards and medals for their outstanding and meritorious service.
Many officers and men of the Assam Police, laid down their lives in the fight against extremism since 1986.

List of receivers for 2011 President's Police Medal for Gallantry:
 Constable Nirmal Chandra Deka.(Posthumously)

Police Medal for gallantry on republic day 2017.
 Pranab Kumar Gogoi Circle Inspector.
 Utpal Borah.Sub-Inspector
 Anurag Agarwal.SP
 Prakash Sonowal.SDPO
 Imdad Ali.SDPO
 Mahananda Gauria.Constable
 Ghanakanta Malakar.Constable
 Hemkanta Boro.Constable
 Ratneshwar Kalita.Constable
 Bapan Roy

Equipment and Vehicles 

All the equipment for the Assam Police are manufactured indigenously by the Indian Ordnance Factories, Ministry of Defence, Government of India.

 Lee–Enfield .303 (Phased out)
 1A SLR Rifle
 1B1INSAS Rifle. (Present Standard Issue)
 Sterling submachine gun.
 AKM (For Special Operations) Indian.
 AK-47 Bulgarian.
 Heckler & Koch MP5
 Bren light machine gun.
 PK Machine Gun (Limited Quantity).
 Pistol Auto 9mm 1A (Standard Service Weapon for Officers )
 Glock 17 (Special Security only)
 Revolver. (Officer's Service weapon. Being phased out)

Vehicles 

 Toyota Innova
 Mahindra Scorpio
 Tata Safari (VIP Protection & Convoy)
 HM Ambassador (Being phased Out)

Vehicles Used for General Duty purpose.

 Mahindra Bolero
 Maruti Gypsy .
 Tata Sumo .
 Tata 407 Trucks .
 Buses for transportation of troops.
 Bajaj Pulsar Bikes. (Patrolling)
 Royal Enfield
 Maruti Omni. (For Guwahati City traffic only)
 Mahindra Commander Jeep. (Phased out)
 Tata Spacio.
 Mahindra Legend
 Mahindra Invader
 Mahindra Thar
 Vajra by VRDE for Riot control
 Varun by VRDE for Riot control
 Chevrolet Tavera Traffic Interceptor vehicle

Controversies 
There are many allegations and court cases of police brutality, custodial death, human rights violations, fake encounter killing, extortion, filling fake cases to harass the general public, corruption filed against the Assam Police. Because of the corrupt politicians the police have always complained not being able to function properly. Different organizations and their open extortion are known to the public and the police also have been alleged to have a fair share on those. Another main acquisition of Assam police in the present is that they are the friends of thieves, kidnappers and murderers rather than the public and it is said that the police has a better share in those crime money. Corruption of the organization is at peak with people fearing to go to the police against a crime as they need to pay money to file an FIR or take actions.

2021 Assam Police Fake Encounters  

Starting May 2021 several fake police encounters took place. National Human Rights Commission has been approached with human rights violation in the alleged fake encounters. On 21 December a Public Interest Litigation petition has been filed by Arif Jwadder before the Gauhati High Court demanding independent investigation over the fake encounters killings. Till date 51 deaths and 139 injuries have occurred till date.

References 
11. Assam Direct Exam 2022 "Assam Direct Exam will conduct by the state govt. of Assam" Schemebygovernment.com

Hdhub4u
12. Assam Direct Exam 2022 "Assam Direct Exam will conduct by the state govt. of Assam" bum-bollywood.com

Government of Assam
State law enforcement agencies of India
1826 establishments in India
Government agencies established in 1826